Macleans College is a co-educational state secondary school located in Eastern Beach, Auckland, New Zealand. The school is named after the Scottish MacLean family who lived and farmed the land of the school and surrounding reserves, and the school emblem contains the castle from their family crest along with six waves which symbolise the seaside location of the school. Metro placed Macleans College as the number one Auckland high school in 2010 among those in the Cambridge International Examinations system. In 2014, Macleans College ranked 2nd nationally in the Cambridge International Examinations.

History
The school is named after the MacLean family. Robert and Every Maclean immigrated to New Zealand from Scotland. The family farmed the areas of land located in Howick that is the school's current location, as well as the surrounding government controlled reserves.

The school was opened in 1980 by then Governor General Sir David Beattie with an initial roll of 199 students. The first principal was Colin Prentice, who later became director of World Vision in New Zealand, followed by his deputy Allan McDonald in 1989. In 2000, upon McDonald's retirement, Byron J. Bentley, became principal.

In 2015, the school auditorium was renamed the 'Colin Prentice Auditorium' in honour of the late founding principal after his passing. In 2017, Byron Bentley announced his retirement as principal. He stood as the longest serving principal of the school, governing for 18 years. An official student publication "The Collegian" launched in 2018.

House system
Upon admission, pupils are placed into one of the eight 'whanau houses'. These houses are named after significant New Zealanders, and the traits and achievements of this person influences the houses environment, charity and what it encourages. The selection is random, unless the student has or had any sibling or parent attend the school wherein the student has an option to be enrolled in the same house, or be randomly placed in any of the other seven.

The Whanau House system at Macleans divides the school into houses of about 300 students each, with two form classes of 30 or so students for each year level, all from the same house. The 'whanau house' system had previously been trialled at Penrose High School (now One Tree Hill College) by modifying existing buildings, but Macleans College was the first state school in New Zealand to be purpose-built around the system.

The original houses were Kupe, Hillary, Te Kanawa and Rutherford, although Hillary was rebuilt and reopened on 29 October 1992 after it burnt down on 13 October 1991. Mansfield House was hastily opened in 1984 due to a surge in the school's roll, however the building itself was used earlier as temporary classrooms, having been airlifted via helicopter as prefabricated units. More houses have been added as the roll has increased, with the latest addition being Upham, which was opened in 2003. The school currently has a roll of over 2,500 students.

The school is currently in the process of rebuilding all of its previous buildings due to leaks found and poor original construction. The school is in consideration with the Ministry of Education about all of these rebuilds. The Batten, Snell, Rutherford, Kupe, Upham, Te Kanawa, Hillary and Mansfield, along with staffroom, resource room and student advisory have all been completed, with the technology and sciences blocks currently under renovation. Through this process, classes has often been relocated to 'X Block', a set of temporary prefabricated units that are parked on a tennis court.

The school has also recently added an astroturf for sports such as co-curricular football and rugby next to the pre-existing tennis courts located across the school fields. Changing rooms, and other facilities have been built around these areas.

Setting and buildings
Macleans College is located in Macleans Park, the largest passive reserve in the Howick/Pakuranga district. Due to its sloping terrain, the school has wide views of the adjacent Eastern Beach. The property where Macleans is located on was bought from the Crown by Ngāi Tai ki Tāmaki for $97 million in 2021.

Each Whanau House has a one-storey building (with the exception of Batten, which has two due to being on a slope). This is due to a ban of buildings of over one storey in the whole Bucklands Beach-Eastern Beach area due to the scenery. Each house contains around 5 classrooms and 1 science lab and sometimes a computer lab, and often several associated prefabs (Kupe, Mansfield, Te Kanawa, Batten). Each Whanau House building also has a large central indoor commons area, which, along with being a general purpose socialising space, is used for house assemblies, lunch eating, and various co-curricular activities. Hillary, Kupe, Rutherford and Te Kanawa were built to a common design plan, known as the Whanau plan or S80 plan. Classroom blocks nearly identical to these were also built at Penrose High School and at Mountainview High School in Timaru. However these buildings have since been rebuilt according to new plan allowing for less classrooms and larger open commons spaces.

The school also contains specialised non-house associated Science and Technology, Computing, Graphics, Art, Music, and Engineering buildings, along with the large Barbara Kendall gymnasiums and a smaller Colin Prentice auditorium for productions and performance.

Students

Demographics
At the May 2014 Education Review Office (ERO) review of the school, Macleans College had 2271 students, not including 304 international students. Fifty-three percent of students were male and 47 percent were female. The school had an Asian majority with 54 percent of students identifying as such, including 31 percent as Chinese and 11 percent as Indian. Forty percent of students identified as European, including 27 percent as New Zealand European (Pākehā). Māori made up three percent and Pacific Islanders make up one percent of the roll.

Macleans College has a socio-economic decile of 9 (step Q), meaning it draws its school community from areas of low to moderately-low socioeconomic disadvantage when compared to other New Zealand schools. This changed from decile 10 (funding step Z) at the beginning of 2015, as part of the nationwide review of deciles following the 2013 census.

International students
The colleges main foreign student demographic is Chinese in ethnicity, though other student from Germany, Hungry, Brazil, Japan, Nepal etc. are also present.

Qualifications
In 2013, 97.6 percent of students leaving Macleans College held at least NCEA Level 1 or IGCSE, 95.5 percent held at least NCEA Level 2 or AS, and 86.2 percent held at least University Entrance standard. This is compared to 85.2%, 74.2%, and 49.0% respectively for all students nationally.

Notable alumni
Andrew de Boorder – cricketer, Auckland
Derek de Boorder – cricketer, Auckland
Scott Campbell – baseball, Minor league, Arizona Diamondbacks
Colin Craig - businessman and founding leader of the Conservative Party of New Zealand
Jarek Goebel – rugby, Auckland Blues
Kirsten Hellier – javelin, 1992 Olympics, 1990 and 1994 Commonwealth Games
Barbara Kendall – windsurfing, 1992, 1996, 2000, 2004 and 2008 Olympics; the Barbara Kendall school gymnasium is named after her
Sean Lovemore – football, Wellington Phoenix
Aaron McIntosh – windsurfing, 1996 and 2000 Olympics
Corey Main – swimming, 2016 Olympics
Kyle Mills – cricketer, New Zealand team
Cameron Norrie - tennis, Achieved world ranking of No. 10 in April 2022 
Rhona Robertson – badminton, 1992 and 1996 Olympics
Kamahl Santamaria – journalist
Ryan Sissons – triathlete, 2012 Olympics
Elizabeth Stokes - The Beths
Jonathan Pearce - The Beths
Natalie Taylor – women's basketball, 2008 Olympics
Brooke Walker – cricketer, New Zealand team
Mark Weldon – swimmer, 1992 Olympics, former CEO of the New Zealand Exchange (NZX) and MediaWorks New Zealand
Ingrid Leary - Labour MP for Dunedin South, since 2020
Austen Heuvel – athletics, 2013 Youth Olympic Festival, 2013 Oceania Games

References

External links
Macleans College website

Cambridge schools in New Zealand
Secondary schools in Auckland
Educational institutions established in 1980
1980 establishments in New Zealand